UK Dating Awards, shortened to the UKDAs, are annual awards given for excellence in the British dating industry.  The UKDAs were first conferred in 2014.

The nominations in each category are generated by self-entry.  Entries are then shortlisted, and winners voted on by a panel of industry experts.  Certain categories are voted for in a public vote.

The Awards are presented at a ceremony at Armoury House in North London. They are supported by the Online Dating Association.

The Awards were created by Charly Lester, a dating blogger, journalist and former Global Head of Dating for Time Out media group. In 2015 Lester announced the creation of complementary US Dating Awards and European Dating Awards, both of which launched in 2016.

Winners

2016
Best Customer Service - Drawing Down the Moon Matchmaking 
Online Dating Brand of the Year - The Inner Circle
Daters' Favourite Dating Site - Christian Connection
Dating App of the Year - Hinge
Best New Dating Brand - ooOo
Dating Expert of the Year - Jo Hemmings
Matchmaking Agency of the Year - Simantov International
Upcoming Matchmaker of the Year - Soiree Society NI
Dating Writer of the Year - Stella Grey
ioSquare Innovation Within the Industry - Good Deed Dating
Best Dating-Related Marketing Campaign - TrueView
Scamalytics Safer Dating Award - TrueView
Best Niche Dating Brand - Christian Connection
Best Use of Social Media - Lovestruck.com
Matchmaker Academy Best New Dating Individual - Ane Auret
Dating Events Brand of the Year - Smudged Lipstick
Dating Ink Dating Blogger of the Year - Naomi Lewis
Best Commercial Dating Blog - Cupid.com
Best Dating TV Show -  First Dates
Founder's Award - George Kidd

2015
Founder’s Award – For 30 Years Service to the Industry – Mary Balfour, Drawing Down the Moon 
Online Dating Brand of the Year – Lovestruck.com
Daters’ Favourite Dating Site – Christian Connection
Dating Writer of the Year – Daisy Buchanan
Dating Expert of the Year – Susan Quilliam
Dating Entrepreneur of the Year – Turn Partners
Best Newcomer Individual – Tara McDonnell
Blogger of the Year – Jordi Sinclair, 30 Something London
Best New Dating Site – Bristlr
Best New Dating App – Clocked
Matchmaking Agency of the Year – Drawing Down the Moon
Best Niche Dating Site –Christian Connection
Best White Label Dating Site – We Love Dates
Dating Events Brand of the Year – The Inner Circle
Most Original Dating Event – Playdate
Innovation in the Dating Industry – TrueView
Safer Dating – Venntro
Best Dating-Related Marketing Campaign – Match.com
Best Commercial Dating Blog – Toyboy Warehouse
Best Customer Service – Guardian Soulmates

2014
Dating Website of the Year – Lovestruck.com
Best Newcomer Dating App – TrueView
Daters’ Favourite Dating Site – The Guardian Soulmates
Best Religious Dating Site – Christian Connection
Dating App of the Year – Lovestruck.com
Best Newcomer Dating Website – The Inner Circle
Best Niche Dating Site – Muddy Matches
Matchmaker of the Year – Caroline Brealey, Mutual Attraction
Blogger of the Year – Katy Horwood, All Sweetness and Life
Dating Journalist of the Year – Andy Jones
Dating Expert of the Year – Jo Hemmings
Dating Entrepreneur of the Year – Turn Partners
Best New Dating Individual – Saskia Nelson
Dating Column of the Year – Tom Craine, Cosmopolitan
Dating Blog of the Year – All Sweetness and Life
Best New Dating Blog – Urban Social - UrbanSocial
Dating TV Show of the Year – First Dates
Best Magazine for Dating – Cosmopolitan - Cosmopolitan
Best Dating-Related Marketing Campaign – The Guardian Soulmates
Safer Dating Award – Scamalytics
Best London Dating Event – The Inner Circle
Best Speed Dating Event – Date in a Dash
Best Food or Drink Event – Table8
Most Original Dating Event – Loveflutter
Best Singles Party – Lovestruck.com
Founder’s Award – Trailblazer of the Year – tinder

References

Further reading
The Herald

External links

British awards
Dating